Goodyer is the surname of:

 Arthur Goodyer (1854–1932), English footballer
 John Goodyer (1592–1664), English botanist
 Paula Goodyer (born 1947), Australian freelance journalist, author and health writer
 Robin Goodyer (born 1951), English cricketer

See also
 Goodere, a surname
 Goodier, a surname
 Goodyear, a surname